Bingo is the fourth studio album by The Whispers. Released in 1974, this would be their final album for Janus Records before they moved over Don Cornelius's Soul Train Records.

Track listing

Personnel
The Whispers
Walter "Walt" Scott, Wallace "Scotty" Scott – lead tenors
Marcus Hutson – baritone
Leaveil Degree – first tenor
Nicholas Caldwell – second tenor, baritone

Musicians
Norman Harris, Bobby Eli – electric guitars
Ronnie Baker – bass
Earl Young – drums
Larry Washington – congas, bongos
Ron Kersey – piano, organ
Bunny Sigler – piano
Robert Cupit – bongos
Vincent Montana Jr. – vibraphone

References

External links
 

1974 albums
The Whispers albums
Albums produced by Norman Harris
Albums recorded at Sigma Sound Studios
Janus Records albums